Nathan Wetherell (24 December 1808 – 7 February 1887) was an English cricketer with amateur status. He was associated with Cambridge University and made his first-class debut in 1828.

Wetherell was educated at Winchester College and Trinity Hall, Cambridge. He was admitted to the Inner Temple and was called to the Bar in 1834.

References

1808 births
1887 deaths
English cricketers
English cricketers of 1826 to 1863
Cambridge University cricketers
People from Westbury-on-Severn
People educated at Winchester College
Alumni of Trinity Hall, Cambridge
Members of the Inner Temple
English barristers